Since Israel held two legislative elections in 2019, the term 2019 Israeli legislative election may refer to:
April 2019 Israeli legislative election
September 2019 Israeli legislative election